Raúl Corcio Zavaleta  (born 20 March 1937 - Died 28 October 2022) was a  Salvadoran professional footballer. He coached in El Salvador.

Club career
He joined newly promoted Club Deportivo Aguila in 1959, he assisted the club in winning back to back titles (1959, 1960–61). The latter was under the management of Honduran Carlos Padilla who played a major part in Zavaleta next move. Zavaleta became the first Salvadoran to join Honduran powerhouse Olimpia, In his  two years (1963-1965) with Olimpia he was able to win one championship.

International career
Corcio has represented El Salvador.

Managerial career
In 1987, he took up his first post as a coach when he took charge of Cojutepeque. He was appointed manager of  ADET in 1990.

Personal life
He died on 28 October 2022 at the age of 78.

References

External links
 http://www.edhdeportes.com/index.php/categoria-futbol-nacional/11962-que-paso-con-corcio-zavaleta
 https://www.laprensagrafica.com/deportes/ldquoEl-Bichordquo-que-se-nacionalizo-salvadoreno-20150114-0063.html

1937 births
Living people
Sportspeople from Santa Ana, El Salvador
Salvadoran footballers
Salvadoran expatriate footballers
El Salvador international footballers
C.D. Águila footballers
C.D. Luis Ángel Firpo footballers
Salvadoran football managers
C.D. Olimpia players
Expatriate footballers in Honduras
Salvadoran expatriate sportspeople in Honduras
Association football forwards